Malayemys is a genus of turtles in the family Geoemydidae. It was considered monotypic until 2005 It is found in several countries of Southeast Asia.

Taxonomy
The genus description is attributed to Wassili Adolfovitch Lindholm in 1931.
Damonia was used by John Edward Gray in 1869, but is considered a junior homonym. It was considered monotypic until 2004. As of 2016, the genus consists of three species: Malayemys macrocephala, Malayemys subtrijuga and Malayemys khoratensis. The name Malayemys isan has been demonstrated to have not been published until after the name M. khoratensis if it was published under the code at all.

The genus consists of three species.
Malayemys macrocephala
Malayemys subtrijuga
Malayemys khoratensis

Distribution
Malayemys has a native distribution in Cambodia, Laos, Malaysia, Thailand, and Vietnam, and was introduced into Java, Indonesia.

References

Geoemydidae
Reptiles of Cambodia
Reptiles of Laos
Reptiles of Malaysia
Reptiles of Thailand
Reptiles of Vietnam
Reptiles of Indonesia
Turtle genera
Taxa named by Wassili Adolfovitch Lindholm